The Prohibition of Mixed Marriages Act, Act No. 55 of 1949, was an apartheid law in South Africa that prohibited marriages between "whites" and "non-whites". It was among the first pieces of apartheid legislation to be passed following the National Party's rise to power in 1948. Subsequent legislation, especially the Population Registration and Immorality Acts of 1950, facilitated its implementation by requiring all individuals living in South Africa to register as a member of one of four officially defined racial groups and prohibiting extramarital sexual relationships between those classified as "white" on the one hand and those classified as "non-White" (Blacks, Coloureds, later also Asians) on the other. It did not criminalize sexual relationships between those classified as "non-europeans.

History

Background
Mixed races relationships occurred in South Africa as far back as 1669, and often took place between Dutch colonizers and indigenous South African women.

While mixed marriages did not become completely taboo until the rise of the National Party in 1948, in the years immediately preceding the passing of this Act, mixed marriages accounted for just a small fraction of all marriages in South Africa, and occurred almost evenly between the four defined racial groups (Black, Coloured, White, and Asiatic).

Implementation
It was implemented in 1951, 
Enforcement of the act was left to the police, who often followed people to their homes to ensure they were not in violation and raided the homes of those believed to be in a mixed marriage. The act applied to all mixed marriages between South Africans, so even marriages which took place in another country were not recognized within South Africa. The punishment for people found to be in a mixed marriage involved arrest and a jail sentence. Anyone who knowingly officiated a marriage that violated the act was also subject to a punishment: a fine was imposed  not exceeding 50 pounds. Anyone who was found to have lied to an officiant was also subject to the legal punishment for perjury.

Some of the social consequences of entering into a mixed-race marriage included being ostracized from or ridiculed by one's family and community. One example is a white South African sex worker named Ethal, who indicated that she  felt more accepted by her peers when she was a sex worker than when she married a black African man.

Legislative history
The Prohibition of Mixed Marriages Amendment Act of 1968 updated the original legislation to invalidate interracial marriages involving a South African citizen that were contracted in other countries.

The Prohibition of Mixed Marriages Act was repealed by the Immorality and Prohibition of Mixed Marriages Amendment Act, 1985, which was passed during the presidency of P. W. Botha.

Immorality amendment Act ,1950

Anti-miscegenation laws
Apartheid legislation in South Africa
Interracial marriage

References

Further reading
 Mixed Marriages Act, South End Museum
 The Prohibition of Mixed Marriages Act commences, SA History

External links

1949 in South African law
Apartheid laws in South Africa
Marriage reform
Marriage, unions and partnerships in South Africa
Marriage law
Interracial marriage